Ben K. Green (1912–1974) was an author who wrote about horses and the post-World War I American West.  His books consist of anecdotes drawn from his own experiences in the Southwestern United States.

He was born in Cumby, Texas and raised in Weatherford, Texas. Before he was twenty years old he had successfully earned a living trading horses and mules and raising cattle and sheep.  The common trading practice"cheat or be cheated"is reflected in his stories, told using the language and humor of the area and not excluding himself from either outcome.

It is often said that he studied at Cornell University and in England but Cornell University has no record of this, and he did not ever become a certified or licensed doctor of veterinary medicine according to records from the Texas State Board of Veterinary Medical Examiners.  He was persuaded to settle in Fort Stockton, Texas and practiced in the entire Trans-Pecos Region.  A large part of his work involved identifying plants which grew in that alkali soil and contained substances poisonous to horses, cattle, sheep, and hogs (lechuguilla, yellow-weed, pinguey, locoweed).

List of books 
 Horse Tradin, New York: Alfred A. Knopf, 1967
 Some More Horse Tradin, Amazon, 2000
 The Village Horse Doctor West of the Pecos, New York: Alfred A. Knopf, 1971
 Wild Cow Tales
 A Thousand Miles of Mustangin, Northland Press
 Horse Tales
 The Color of Horses: A Scientific and Authoritative Identification of the Color of the Horse, Northland Press, 1974
 The Shield Mares, Encino Press, 1967
 " Horse Conformation as to soundness and performance ", Northland Press, 1969, revised 1988, ISBN 0-87358--135-0

References

External links 
 

1912 births
1974 deaths
Writers from Texas
American veterinarians
Male veterinarians
20th-century American non-fiction writers
People from Hopkins County, Texas
People from Weatherford, Texas
People from Fort Stockton, Texas